Ramón de Elorriaga (31 August 1836 – 1898) was a Spanish painter.

De Elorriaga was born in Bilbao, Biscay province, and studied painting in Madrid and Rome. He visited the United States of America in 1875 to 1876. He died in Bilbao.

De Elorriaga is credited as the artist of an 1889 painting of the inauguration of George Washington as the first President of the United States. The painting is in the collection of the Federal Hall National Memorial in New York City.

References

1836 births
1898 deaths
19th-century Spanish painters
19th-century Spanish male artists
Spanish male painters